Temir (Temır) is a town in Aktobe Region of western Kazakhstan. It serves as the administrative center of Temir District. Population:

References

Populated places in Aktobe Region
Ural Oblast (Russian Empire)